Tutto è possibile is the debut album studio by Finley, released in 2006. It  was rereleased in the spring-summer of the same year in a Gold Edition, with the addition of the song Dentro Alla Scatola (track 17), with Mondo Marcio. In November 2006, it was again released in a Special Edition Hard Pop, containing 3 covers and a DVD, to celebrate the group's being awarded Best Italian Act at the MTV Europe Music Awards. The 5 singles that were released are: Tutto è possibile, Diventerai Una Star, Sole di settembre, Fumo e cenere and Scegli me (also Dentro alla scatola).

Track listing

Band members
 Marco Pedretti - lead vocals
 Carmine Ruggiero - electric lead guitar and backing vocals
 Stefano Mantegazza - electric bass guitar and backing vocals
 Danilo Calvio - drum kit and backing vocals

2006 debut albums
Finley (band) albums